The Roman Catholic Diocese of Udaipur is a diocese located in the city of Udaipur in the Ecclesiastical province of Agra in India.

History
 3 December 1984: Established as Diocese of Udaipur from the Diocese of Ajmer–Jaipur

Leadership
 Bishops of Udaipur (Latin Rite)
 Bishop Joseph Pathalil (3 December 1984 – 21 December 2012)
 Bishop Devprasad John Ganawa, SVD (21 December 2012 – present)

References

External links
 GCatholic.org 
 Catholic Hierarchy 

Roman Catholic dioceses in India
Christian organizations established in 1984
Roman Catholic dioceses and prelatures established in the 20th century
Christianity in Rajasthan
1984 establishments in Rajasthan